Meindert Dijkstra (born 28 February 1967) is a Dutch former footballer who played primarily at right back. He spent a majority of his career playing in the Dutch leagues, only spending two seasons abroad when he played in England for Notts County. He is the father of Caitlin Dijkstra, who is also a professional footballer.

Club career
Dijkstra began his career in 1985 with NAC Breda, before moving to local rivals Willem II two years later, where he spent five seasons. Following this he moved abroad and joined Notts County, before returning to Holland with RBC Roosendaal for the 1994/95 season, finally finishing his career at TOP Oss.

After retiring as a player, Dijkstra has been involved in academy football at several amateur sides in the North Brabant province.

References

1967 births
Living people
Footballers from Breda
Association football fullbacks
Dutch footballers
NAC Breda players
Willem II (football club) players
Notts County F.C. players
RBC Roosendaal players
TOP Oss players
Eredivisie players
Eerste Divisie players
English Football League players
Dutch expatriate footballers
Expatriate footballers in England
Dutch expatriate sportspeople in England